Erick Vinicius Silva (born June 21, 1984) is a Brazilian former mixed martial artist who competed in the Welterweight division. A professional from 2005 till 2019, he competed for the Ultimate Fighting Championship, Bellator MMA, and Jungle Fight, where he was the inaugural Welterweight Champion. He is also former UFC Bantamweight fighter Gabriel Silva's big brother.

Mixed martial arts career

Background and early career
Silva comes from Vila Velha, Brazil and was an X-Gym training partner for the likes of Anderson Silva, Rafael Feijao and Jacare Souza.

Jungle Fight Championship
Silva joined Jungle Fight, appearing at Jungle Fight 9 against Carlos Eduardo dos Santos. In the third and final round, Silva defeated dos Santos via rear naked choke.

At Jungle Fight 11, he defeated Igor Fernandes via unanimous decision. Silva followed that up with two further victories in the promotion.

Silva then competed in a unique fight of his career, at Jungle Fight 17, which was held outdoors. On the day of the event, the weather was clear throughout, until less than an hour before the start, when rain began to fall and never stopped. The event, which went down as one of the wettest in MMA history was not a successful one for Silva who hit his downed opponent with a knee, resulting in a no contest verdict.

Silva won his next fight, at Jungle Fight 21, via TKO (knee and punches) in the second round.

Silva then entered into the tournament for the inaugural Jungle Fight Welterweight Championship at Jungle Fight 23. Silva defeated both opponents on the same night to win the tournament. His opening round matchup was against Gil de Freitas. The opening round saw Silva utilize his striking game to take the first round, though de Freitas came back strongly in the second round with his take downs and effective ground game. In the final round, Silva caught de Freitas with a roundhouse kick to the liver, dropping him. After Silva used ground-and-pound to set up a guillotine choke, de Freitas was forced to tap out.

Silva progressed to the tournament final, where he faced the Mexican, Francisco Ayon. Ayon had just come off a split decision victory in the semi-final and he wasn't able to mount any offense against Silva, who took him down. After hitting him with several punches, Silva locked in an arm triangle choke to force the tap out with just 67 seconds on the clock. Silva therefore became the inaugural Jungle Fight Welterweight champion.

Ultimate Fighting Championship
Silva signed with the UFC in early 2011.  He was expected to make his debut against Mike Swick at UFC 134.  However, on August 4, 2011, it was announced that Swick had to withdraw from the bout due to a knee injury and was replaced by Luis Ramos. Silva won quickly via first round TKO due to punches.

Silva was expected to face promotional newcomer Siyar Bahadurzada on January 14, 2012 at UFC 142.  However, Bahadurzada was forced out of the bout with an injury and replaced by Carlo Prater. After missing a looping right hook in the opening seconds of the fight, Silva quickly followed with a left knee to the body which effectively knocked Prater down. Prater caught Silva's knee and held on to his leg as Silva began attacking with hammer fists and punches to the head. During the attack, the referee, Mario Yamasaki, repeatedly warned Silva not to hit the back of the head. When Prater appeared to go unconscious and could no longer intelligently defend himself, Yamasaki stepped in and stopped the fight. Although Silva appeared victorious, Yamasaki disqualified Silva for strikes to the back of the head. The disqualification was later upheld by the UFC.

Silva then faced Charlie Brenneman on June 8, 2012 at UFC on FX 3. Silva won the fight with a rear-naked choke late in the first round.

Silva faced Jon Fitch on October 13, 2012 at UFC 153 in Rio de Janeiro, Brazil. After three rounds, Silva lost the fight via unanimous decision (30–27, 29–28, and 29–28). The performance earned both participants Fight of the Night honors.

Silva was expected to face Jay Hieron on February 2, 2013 at UFC 156.  However, Silva pulled out of the bout citing an injury and was replaced by promotional newcomer Tyron Woodley.

Silva was expected to face John Hathaway on June 8, 2013 at UFC on Fuel TV 10.  However, Hathaway was pulled from the bout in late April and replaced by Jason High, who was already scheduled on the card against Ildemar Alcantara. Silva won the fight via triangle armbar submission. The finished earned him his second Submission of the Night bonus.

Silva faced Dong Hyun Kim on October 9, 2013 at UFC Fight Night 29.  Kim defeated Silva via second round KO.

Silva was expected to face returning veteran Nate Loughran on February 15, 2014 at UFC Fight Night 36. However, Loughran was forced out of the bout with an injury. Silva instead faced promotional newcomer Takenori Sato. He won the fight via TKO early in the first round.  The win also earned him one of the first UFC Performance of the Night bonus awards.

Silva faced Matt Brown in the main event at UFC Fight Night 40. He lost the fight via TKO due to punches in the third round. Despite the loss, Silva was given a Fight of the Night bonus award for his performance.

Silva faced Mike Rhodes on December 20, 2014 at UFC Fight Night 58. He won the fight by technical submission in the first round.  The win also earned Silva his second Performance of the Night bonus award.

Silva was expected to face Ben Saunders on March 21, 2015 at UFC Fight Night 62.  However, on March 6, Saunders was forced from the fight citing an injury and was replaced by Josh Koscheck.  Silva won the fight by submission in the first round.

Silva was expected to face Rick Story on June 27, 2015 at UFC Fight Night 70.  However, Silva was removed from the card on June 19, after visa issues restricted his entry to the United States.  In turn, Story was removed from the card as well. The bout with Story was rescheduled and was expected to take place on August 23, 2015 at UFC Fight Night 74.  Subsequently, Story pulled out of the bout on August 11 citing injury and was replaced by Neil Magny. Silva lost the fight via split decision.

On March 5, 2016, Silva faced Nordine Taleb at UFC 196 at the MGM Grand in Las Vegas.  He lost the fight via knockout in the second round. During the opening round, Silva extended his fist to Taleb to touch gloves in a sign of sportsmanship, but immediately landed a right hook as Taleb attempted to reciprocate it and respond to Silva's gesture. Taleb called the move dirty in a post-fight interview and stated he knew Silva was a "dirty" fighter. He received heavy criticism from fans and media and later apologized on his Twitter account, releasing a statement and admitting it was "unethical".

After the loss, Silva decided to establish his own fight team, Tiger's Den MMA, to be closer to his son, Kalleu. He brought in Andre Benkei to be his head coach. Silva was briefly scheduled to face Brandon Thatch on September 24, 2016 at UFC Fight Night 95. However, Thatch pulled out of the fight with an undisclosed injury and was subsequently replaced by Luan Chagas. He won the back and forth fight via submission in the third round. Both participants were awarded Fight of the Night honors.

Silva faced Yancy Medeiros on June 3, 2017 at UFC 212. He lost the fight via TKO in the second round.

Silva faced Jordan Mein on December 16, 2017 at UFC on Fox: Lawler vs. dos Anjos. He lost the fight by unanimous decision. The fight with Mein was the last of his contract with UFC.

Legacy Fighting Alliance
Following his departure from the UFC, Silva signed with Legacy Fighting Alliance and debuted in the main event at LFA 45 against Nick Barnes on July 20, 2018. He won the fight via submission in the first round.

Bellator MMA
On September 6, 2018, it was announced that Silva had signed a multi-fight deal with Bellator MMA. Silva was expected to make his promotional debut against Lorenz Larkin at Bellator 207, but was forced to pull out due to an injury on October 1, 2018.

Silva made his promotional debut against Yaroslav Amosov at Bellator 216 on February 16, 2019. He lost the fight via unanimous decision.

Silva faced Paul Daley at Bellator 223 on June 22, 2019. He lost the fight by unanimous decision.

Silva announced his retirement from MMA in 2022 after revealing that he had suffered a heart attack due to complications from Covid-19.

Personal life
Erick and his wife Isabela have a son, Carlos (born 2019). Silva has also an older son, Kalleu.

Championships and accomplishments

Mixed martial arts
Ultimate Fighting Championship
Fight of the Night (Three times) vs. Jon Fitch, Matt Brown, and Luan Chagas
Submission of the Night (Two times) vs. Charlie Brenneman and Jason High
Performance of the Night (Two times) vs. Takenori Sato and Mike Rhodes
Jungle Fight Championship
Jungle Fight Welterweight Championship
Jungle Fight Welterweight Tournament Champion
MMAJunkie.com
2014 May Fight of the Month vs. Matt Brown
Sherdog
2012 Robbery of the Year

Mixed martial arts record

|-
|Loss
|align=center|20–11 (1)
|Paul Daley
|Decision (unanimous)
|Bellator 223
|
|align=center| 3
|align=center| 5:00
|London, England
| 
|- 
|Loss
|align=center|20–10 (1)
|Yaroslav Amosov
|Decision (unanimous)
|Bellator 216
|
|align=center|3
|align=center|5:00
|Uncasville, Connecticut, United States
|
|- 
|Win
|align=center|20–9 (1)
|Nick Barnes
|Submission (armbar)
|LFA 45
|
|align=center|1
|align=center|4:43
|Cabazon, California, United States
|
|-
|Loss
|align=center|19–9 (1)
|Jordan Mein
|Decision (unanimous)
|UFC on Fox: Lawler vs. dos Anjos
|
|align=center|3
|align=center|5:00
|Winnipeg, Manitoba, Canada
|
|-
|Loss
|align=center|19–8 (1)
|Yancy Medeiros
|TKO (punches)
|UFC 212
|
|align=center|2
|align=center|2:01
|Rio de Janeiro, Brazil
|
|-
|Win
| align=center|19–7 (1)
| Luan Chagas
| Submission (rear-naked choke)
| UFC Fight Night: Cyborg vs. Länsberg
| 
| align=center| 3
| align=center| 3:57
| Brasília, Brazil
| 
|-
| Loss
| align=center|18–7 (1)
| Nordine Taleb
| KO (punch)
| UFC 196
| 
| align=center|2
| align=center|1:34
| Las Vegas, Nevada, United States
|
|-
| Loss
| align=center| 18–6 (1)
| Neil Magny
| Decision (split)
| UFC Fight Night: Holloway vs. Oliveira
| 
| align=center| 3
| align=center| 5:00
| Saskatoon, Saskatchewan, Canada
|
|-
| Win
| align=center| 18–5 (1)
| Josh Koscheck
| Submission (guillotine choke)
| UFC Fight Night: Maia vs. LaFlare
| 
| align=center| 1
| align=center| 4:21
| Rio de Janeiro, Brazil
| 
|-
| Win
| align=center| 17–5 (1)
| Mike Rhodes
| Technical Submission (arm-triangle choke)
| UFC Fight Night: Machida vs. Dollaway
| 
| align=center| 1
| align=center| 1:15
| Barueri, Brazil
| 
|-
| Loss
| align=center| 16–5 (1)
| Matt Brown
| TKO (punches)
| UFC Fight Night: Brown vs. Silva
| 
| align=center| 3
| align=center| 2:11
| Cincinnati, Ohio, United States
| 
|-
| Win
| align=center| 16–4 (1)
| Takenori Sato
| TKO (punches)
| UFC Fight Night: Machida vs. Mousasi
| 
| align=center| 1 
| align=center| 0:52
| Jaraguá do Sul, Brazil
| 
|-
| Loss
| align=center| 15–4 (1)
| Dong Hyun Kim
| KO (punch)
| UFC Fight Night: Maia vs. Shields
| 
| align=center| 2
| align=center| 3:01
| Barueri, Brazil
| 
|-
| Win
| align=center| 15–3 (1)
| Jason High
| Submission (reverse triangle armbar)
| UFC on Fuel TV: Nogueira vs. Werdum
| 
| align=center| 1
| align=center| 1:11
| Fortaleza, Brazil
| 
|-
| Loss
| align=center| 14–3 (1)
| Jon Fitch
| Decision (unanimous)
| UFC 153
| 
| align=center| 3
| align=center| 5:00
| Rio de Janeiro, Brazil
| 
|-
| Win
| align=center| 14–2 (1)
| Charlie Brenneman
| Submission (rear-naked choke)
| UFC on FX: Johnson vs. McCall
| 
| align=center| 1
| align=center| 4:33
| Sunrise, Florida, United States
| 
|-
| Loss
| align=center| 13–2 (1)
| Carlo Prater
| DQ (illegal strikes to back of the head)
| UFC 142
| 
| align=center| 1
| align=center| 0:29
| Rio de Janeiro, Brazil
| 
|-
| Win
| align=center| 13–1 (1)
| Luis Ramos
| KO (punches)
| UFC 134
| 
| align=center| 1
| align=center| 0:40
| Rio de Janeiro, Brazil
| 
|-
| Win
| align=center| 12–1 (1)
| Francisco Ayon
| Submission (arm-triangle choke)
| Jungle Fight 23
| 
| align=center| 1
| align=center| 1:07
| Belém, Brazil
| 
|-
| Win
| align=center| 11–1 (1)
| Gil de Freitas
| Submission (guillotine choke)
| Jungle Fight 23
| 
| align=center| 3
| align=center| 0:57
| Belém, Brazil
| 
|-
| Win
| align=center| 10–1 (1)
| Jose de Ribamar
| KO (knee and punches)
| Jungle Fight 21
| 
| align=center| 2
| align=center| 3:39
| Natal, Brazil
| 
|-
| NC
| align=center| 9–1 (1)
| Henrique Oliveira
| NC (illegal knee)
| Jungle Fight 17: Vila Velha
| 
| align=center| 2
| align=center| 3:57
| Vila Velha, Brazil
| 
|-
| Win
| align=center| 9–1
| Jorge Luis Bezerra
| Decision (unanimous)
| Jungle Fight 15
| 
| align=center| 3
| align=center| 5:00
| São Paulo, Brazil
| 
|-
| Win
| align=center| 8–1
| Carlos Villamor
| Submission (kneebar)
| Jungle Fight 14: Ceará
| 
| align=center| 2
| align=center| 3:38
| Fortaleza, Brazil
| 
|-
| Win
| align=center| 7–1
| Igor Fernandes
| Decision (unanimous)
| Jungle Fight 11
| 
| align=center| 3
| align=center| 5:00
| Rio de Janeiro, Brazil
| 
|-
| Win
| align=center| 6–1
| Carlos Eduardo Santos
| Submission (rear-naked choke)
| Jungle Fight 9: Warriors
| 
| align=center| 3
| align=center| N/A
| Rio de Janeiro, Brazil
| 
|-
| Win
| align=center| 5–1
| Fabio Issa
| Decision (unanimous)
| Open Fight
| 
| align=center| N/A
| align=center| N/A
| Brazil
| 
|-
| Loss
| align=center| 4–1
| Mario Neto
| Decision (unanimous)
| Superfight Vitoria
| 
| align=center| 3
| align=center| 5:00
| Brazil
| 
|-
| Win
| align=center| 4–0
| Leandro Zumbi
| Submission (arm-triangle choke)
| MMA: Kombat Espirito Santo
| 
| align=center| 1
| align=center| 3:05
| Vila Velha, Brazil
| 
|-
| Win
| align=center| 3–0
| Henrique Lango
| Submission (rear-naked choke)
| Guarafight 3
| 
| align=center| 1
| align=center| N/A
| Guarapari, Brazil
| 
|-
| Win
| align=center| 2–0
| Julian Soares
| KO (punch)
| Guarafight 2
| 
| align=center| 1
| align=center| 2:30
| Guarapari, Brazil
| 
|-
| Win
| align=center| 1–0
| Fabiano Mastodonte
| Submission (rear-naked choke)
| Guarafight 1
| 
| align=center| 1
| align=center| 2:02
| Guarapari, Brazil
|

See also 
 List of male mixed martial artists

References

External links
Official UFC Profile

Brazilian male mixed martial artists
Welterweight mixed martial artists
Mixed martial artists utilizing judo
Mixed martial artists utilizing Brazilian jiu-jitsu
1984 births
Living people
People from Vila Velha
Brazilian male judoka
Brazilian practitioners of Brazilian jiu-jitsu
People awarded a black belt in Brazilian jiu-jitsu
Ultimate Fighting Championship male fighters
Sportspeople from Espírito Santo